The climate of Iceland is subpolar oceanic (Köppen climate classification Cfc) near the southern coastal area and tundra (Köppen ET) inland in the highlands. The island lies in the path of the North Atlantic Current, which makes its climate more temperate than would be expected for its latitude just south of the Arctic Circle. This effect is aided by the Irminger Current, which also helps to moderate the island's temperature. The weather in Iceland is notoriously variable.

The aurora borealis is often visible at night during the winter. The midnight sun can be experienced in summer on the island of Grímsey off the north coast; the remainder of the country, since it lies just south of the polar circle, experiences a twilight period during which the sun sets briefly, but still has around two weeks of continuous daylight during the summer.

Seasons

Winter
The Icelandic winter is relatively mild for its latitude, owing to maritime influence and proximity to the warm currents of the North Atlantic Gyre.

Summer
Warm summer days can reach . Annual average sunshine hours in Reykjavík are around 1300, which is similar to towns in Scotland and Ireland.

Winds and storms
Iceland, especially inland and during winter, is frequently subject to abrupt and dramatic changes in weather that can sharply reduce visibility, as well as rapidly increasing wind speed and precipitation, and shift temperature.

Generally, wind speeds tend to be higher in the highlands, but topographical features can aggravate winds and cause strong gusts in lowland areas. Wind speed in the lowlands reaches  on 10–20 days per year, but on upwards of 50 days per year in places in the highlands. Heavy dust storms can be generated by strong glacial winds, and can be very strong. These storms are very frequent in the early summer in the arid highland areas north of the Vatnajökull glacier.

Thunderstorms are extremely rare for any specific location in Iceland, with fewer than five storms per year in the southern part of the island. They are most common in early or late summer. They can be caused by warm air masses coming up from Europe, or deep lows from the southwest in wintertime. Lightning can usually be observed in connection with ash plumes erupting from the island's volcanoes. Vortices, sometimes on the scale of tornadoes, also occur with volcanic eruptions. Landspouts and waterspouts are occasionally observed. Classic mesocyclone derived tornadoes (i.e. forming from supercells) are very rare, but have been observed. Any of these do occasionally cause damage, although the sparse population further reduces the probability of detection and the hazard.

Atmospheric pressure
There is a persistent area of low pressure near Iceland known as the Icelandic Low, found between Iceland and Greenland. This area affects the amount of air brought into the Arctic to the east, and the amount coming out of the Arctic to the west. It is part of a greater pressure system known as the North Atlantic Oscillation (NAO).

Climatic data

Climate Change 
750 square kilometers of Iceland’s glacier ice has melted since the year 2000. Iceland’s annual CO2 emissions and per capita CO2 emissions rose from 1950 to 2018, but both metrics have been on the decline since 2018. A majority of Iceland’s CO2 emissions come from oil.

Most Icelandic glaciers began retreating in the late 1800s, but current modeling studies suggest that glaciers would lose a quarter of their volume in the next hundred years with just a 1°C rise in global temperatures. The models also predict that glaciers could lose sixty percent of their volume if global temperatures rise by 2°C. At this rate, only small ice caps will remain after two hundred years. Some models predict Iceland's glacial mass will shrink a third by 2100.

Iceland’s retreating glaciers have global and local consequences. Melting of Iceland’s glaciers could raise sea levels by a centimeter, which could lead to erosion and flooding worldwide. Locally, glacial recession could cause crustal uplift, which could disrupt buildings. Some places in Iceland have already seen the crust rise at a rate of 40 millimeters per year.

Okjökull 
Okjokull is a glacier in Iceland that melted in 2014. Okjokull is Iceland's first glacier to have melted due to climate change.

Name Change 
Geologists estimate that Okjokull covered about 6 square miles in the late 1800s, but slowly shrunk until it officially lost its glacier status in 2014. When it "died", the 800 year old glacier's name was changed from Okjokull to Ok. Okjokull was pronounced dead in part due to its decrease in area, but also due to its inability to flow; a body of ice must be able to move to be defined as a glacier. “Jokull” means glacier in Icelandic, so this suffix was removed accordingly.

Funeral 
In 2018, a documentary called Not Ok was released by Rice University anthropologists four years after its death. In 2019, roughly one hundred people held a funeral for Okjokull. Iceland’s prime minister at the time, Katrin Jakobsdottir, was among the attendees.

At the funeral, one high school student read a poem and a commemorative plaque, titled "A letter to the future," was placed on a boulder. As of 2022, this plaque was the only one commemorating a glacier lost to climate change. The plaque warned future readers that all of Iceland's glaciers would soon "follow the same path" as Okjokull.

Sustainability 
In an effort to combat the effects climate change has on Iceland’s glaciers, Iceland has worked to make its electricity completely sustainable. As of 2015, nearly all of its electricity comes from renewable energy. Thirteen percent of the country’s electricity comes from geothermal energy—which also heats ninety percent of Iceland’s homes— and the rest comes from hydropower.

See also
Climate of the Nordic countries
 Geography of Iceland

References

External links

 The dynamic climate of Iceland – A brief description of the country's climate (with maps)
 Reykjavík, Iceland Forecast: Weather Underground – Weather forecast for Reykjavík

 
Iceland